The World Lacrosse Championship (WLC) is the international men's field lacrosse championship organized by World Lacrosse that occurs every four years.

The WLC began before any international lacrosse organization had been formed. It started as a four-team invitational tournament which coincided with Canada's centennial lacrosse celebration in 1967. Canada, the United States, Australia, and England participated. Seven years later, Australia celebrated its lacrosse centenary and another four-team invitational tournament was held between the same countries. After that tournament in 1974, the first international governing body for men's lacrosse was formed, the International Lacrosse Federation (ILF). The ILF merged with the women's governing body in 2008 to form the Federation of International Lacrosse, which changed its name to World Lacrosse in 2019.

The US has won the championship ten times and Canada the other three. With 46 nations competing, the 2018 WLC in Israel was the largest tournament and was the first championship held outside of Australia, Canada, England or the United States.

The oldest world Lacrosse championship match was recorded on April 22, 1870, in Montreal. The Montreal Lacrosse club accepted a challenge vs the Caughnewagw Lacrosse team.

Editions

2006 Championship 

Canada defeated the United States 15–10 in the gold medal game of the 2006 World Championship in London, Ontario. Geoff Snider of Team Canada was named tournament MVP.

2010 Championship 

The 2010 WLC was held in Manchester, England from July 15 to 24. For the first time, a World Lacrosse Festival was sanctioned to run alongside the world championships.

With more nations entering, the Round Robin stage of the tournament featured 30 nations and was split into 7 divisions, considerably larger than ever before. The Iroquois Nationals were unable to participate because the host nation did not recognize the validity of passports issued by the Iroquois confederacy.

The United States defeated Canada 12–10 in the gold medal game to capture their ninth victory at the World Lacrosse Championship.

2014 Championship 

The 2014 WLC was held on July 10–19, 2014 in Commerce City, Colorado, at Dick's Sporting Goods Park, home of the Colorado Rapids soccer team. 38 nations participated in over 142 games. The countries with the top six rankings - Australia, Canada, England, Iroquois, Japan, and the United States - competed in the Blue Division.

Belgium, China, Colombia, Costa Rica, Israel, Russia, Thailand, Turkey, and Uganda all competed in the event for the first time.

Canada defeated the United States 8–5 in the gold medal game to capture their third World Lacrosse Championship.

2018 Championship 

The 2018 WLC was held on July 11–21, 2018 in Netanya, Israel, at Netanya Stadium and Wingate Institute. 46 nations participated in tournament games. The countries with the top six rankings - Australia, Canada, England, Iroquois, Scotland, and the United States - competed in the Blue Division.

United States defeated Canada in the gold medal game, dramatically scoring the controversial game-winning goal at the last second.

Championship hosts 
Hosting responsibilities for the 12 championships from 1967 to 2014 were evenly divided between four countries, with the United States, Canada, Australia, and England each hosting three times.

The 2018 championship in Israel was the first time the tournament expanded beyond the traditional four hosts. For the 2018 edition, World Lacrosse had originally selected England in 2013, but English Lacrosse withdrew in 2017, citing “unacceptable financial risk”, and Israel was selected instead.

Winners

Performance by team

Medal table

Performance by tournament

See also
 Federation of International Lacrosse
 Women's Lacrosse World Cup
 Under-19 World Lacrosse Championships (men and women)
 World Indoor Lacrosse Championship (men)
 Field lacrosse

References

External links
Federation of International Lacrosse official website
2018 WLC official website

 
Recurring sporting events established in 1967